In chemistry, deposition occurs when molecules settle out of a solution.

Deposition can be viewed as a reverse process to dissolution or particle re-entrainment.

See also
 Atomic layer deposition
 Chemical vapor deposition
 Deposition (physics)
 Fouling
 Physical vapor deposition
 Thin-film deposition
 Fused filament fabrication

References 

Chemical processes
Physical chemistry